Wānaka is a popular ski and summer resort town in the Otago region of the South Island of New Zealand. At the southern end of Lake Wānaka, it is at the start of the Clutha River/Mata-Au and is the gateway to Mount Aspiring National Park.

Wānaka is primarily a resort town with both summer and winter seasons. Its economy is based on the many outdoor opportunities this offers.

Historically, Māori visited the Wānaka area to hunt and fish in summer, or on their way to seek pounamu (greenstone) on the West Coast. Ngāi Tahu abandoned their seasonal camps after a raid by a North Island war party in 1836.

The current town was founded as Pembroke during the gold rush of the 19th century, and renamed to Wanaka in 1940. Along with the rest of the Queenstown-Lakes District, Wānaka is growing rapidly, with the population increasing by 50% between 2005 and 2015.

Names

The New Zealand Gazetteer cites the meaning as "the lore of the tohunga or priest".

While the name could also be a variation of Ō-Anake or Ō-Anaka, a proper name, Ngāi Tahu's atlas  dismisses this variation as a simple spelling mistake.

The town was named Wanaka when it was first surveyed in 1863, but renamed Pembroke within a month of the surveyor returning his books to Dunedin. Pembroke was the family name of the Hon Sydney Herbert, a UK Cabinet Minister and member of the Canterbury Association.

The town's name reverted to Wanaka on 1 September 1940 to reduce confusion between the names of the town and the lake. The official name of the lake was updated from Lake Wanaka to Lake Wānaka in 2019, and the town to Wānaka in 2021.

History
A Kāti Māmoe settlement at the site of modern Wānaka was named . 

The area was invaded by the Ngāi Tahu in the early 18th century. Ngāi Tahu visited annually, seeking greenstone in the mountains above the Haast River and hunting eels and birds over summer, then returning to the east coast by descending the Mata-Au in reed boats called mōkihi. Eels and birds were gathered at a lagoon  on the Hāwea side of The Neck, which also supported gardens of potato and turnips. 

Ngāi Tahu use of the land was ended by attacks by North Island tribes. In 1836, the Ngāti Tama chief Te Puoho led a 100-person war party, armed with muskets, down the West Coast and over the Haast Pass. They fell on the Ngāi Tahu encampment between Lake Wānaka and Lake Hāwea, capturing ten people and killing and eating two children. Some of the Ngāi Tahu fled down the Waitaki river to the coast. Te Puoho took his captives over the Crown Range to Lake Wakatipu and thence to Southland where he was killed and his war party destroyed by the southern Ngāi Tahu leader Tuhawaiki.

The first European to visit the area was Nathaniel Chalmers, who was guided inland by Chiefs Reko and Kaikoura in 1853. Reko and Kaikoura showed Chalmers the rock bridge Whatatorere at Roaring Meg, which was the only place that the Kawarau River could be jumped over, and returned him down the Clutha in a  reed boat - arguably the first recorded instance of adventure tourism in the region.

European settlement began in the Upper Clutha River Valley in the 1850s, with the establishment of sheep stations by runholders. The first station was at Albert Town, the only place where settlers could ford the Clutha River. The present site of Wānaka was first surveyed in 1863.<ref
name=lw></ref> Gold was discovered in the nearby Cardrona valley in 1862 with many joining the gold rush. Settlement increased in Pembroke during the 1870s because of timber milling in the Matukituki Valley that used Lake Wānaka for transport.

Mass tourism began in 1867 when Theodore Russell opened the first hotel, and with the world's first sheepdog trials. The first school in the area was opened in Albert Town in 1868. and the Pembroke post office opened in 1873. The Pembroke school opened in 1880 which became the Wanaka District High School in 1940. In 1885 the Commercial Hotel opened in Pembroke and in 1887 the Wanaka Library opened on Ardmore Street. In 1922, the First Wānaka Hotel was destroyed by fire. The following year it was rebuilt as the Wanaka Public Hall. Wānaka was connected to the national electricity grid in 1940 .

Wānaka proved a very popular tourist destination because of its borderline continental climate and easy access to snow and water. With the development of Treble Cone (1968) and Cardrona ski fields (1980), Wānaka grew in popularity as a winter destination.

Geography
The town of Wānaka is at the southern end of Lake Wānaka, surrounded by mountains. To the north the Haast Pass cuts through the Southern Alps near Makarora. To the northeast are the towns of Omarama and Twizel. Lake Wānaka comes within 1km of the slightly smaller Lake Hāwea; they are separated only by rocky ridge called "The Neck". South of Wānaka, the wide Upper Clutha valley leads to Cromwell at the junction of the Kawarau and Clutha / Matau-au rivers.

Glendhu Bay is on the lake's western shore, close to the Mātukituki River valley which gives access to the Mount Aspiring National Park.

The centre of the town lies on flat land beside Roy's Bay. The town has expanded into the hills surrounding the centre and in both directions along the lake shore. The lakeside area of the town is prone to occasional flooding in spring when heavy rain and snowmelt can cause the lake to rise quickly, as in November 1999.

Climate

Despite New Zealand's mostly oceanic climate, Wānaka is one of the few areas in the country to enjoy a semi-continental climate, with four distinct seasons. The weather is fairly dry, with spring (September–December) being the wettest season. Annual rainfall is 682 mm which is half the national average.

Winter can be extreme by New Zealand standards with temperature mostly in the single digits during the day time followed by cold and frosty nights and frequent snowfalls.

Demography
It is the country's 43rd-largest urban area and the fifth-largest urban area in Otago behind Dunedin, Queenstown, Mosgiel and Oamaru.

Wānaka had a population of 9,552 at the 2018 New Zealand census, an increase of 3,078 people (47.5%) since the 2013 census, and an increase of 4,509 people (89.4%) since the 2006 census. There were 3,480 households. There were 4,719 males and 4,842 females, giving a sex ratio of 0.97 males per female, with 1,662 people (17.4%) aged under 15 years, 1,611 (16.9%) aged 15 to 29, 4,599 (48.1%) aged 30 to 64, and 1,695 (17.7%) aged 65 or older.

Ethnicities were 92.7% European/Pākehā, 5.2% Māori, 0.5% Pacific peoples, 4.5% Asian, and 2.5% other ethnicities (totals add to more than 100% since people could identify with multiple ethnicities).

The proportion of people born overseas was 28.9%, compared with 27.1% nationally.

Although some people objected to giving their religion, 60.7% reported no religion, 31.2%  Christian, 1.0% reported Hindu, 0.2% Muslim, 0.5% Buddhist, and 1.7% had other religions.

Of those at least 15 years old, 2,340 (29.7%) people had a bachelor or higher degree, and 720 (9.1%) people had no formal qualifications. 1,641 people (20.8%) earned over $70,000 compared to 17.2% nationally. The employment status of those at least 15 was that 4,386 (55.6%) people were employed full-time, 1,323 (16.8%) were part-time, and 72 (0.9%) were unemployed.

Government
Wānaka is in the Waitaki electorate, represented by the New Zealand National Party's Jacqui Dean since 2005.

Wānaka's local governments are the Queenstown-Lakes District Council and the Otago Regional Council.

Wānaka wine sub-region
The area around Wānaka is a formal sub-region of the Central Otago wine region with several top wineries and vineyards. As with other parts of the wine region, the main grape variety in the area is pinot noir.

Attractions
 With its lake and mountain views, Wānaka has become a popular tourist resort, considered less commercialised than Queenstown.

Wānaka boasts a growing number of restaurants, cafes and a diverse nightlife. Other attractions in the town include Puzzling World and the Paradiso Cinema. Puzzling World contains a maze, optical illusions and a leaning clocktower. The Paradiso is a classic old cinema, with seating consisting of old couches and an in-theatre Morris Minor. There are several wineries in the area. Just out of town next to the Wānaka Airport is the National Transport and Toy Museum.

In winter, Wānaka is an excellent place to see the Southern Lights.

A number of mountains surrounding Wānaka can be climbed, including Roys Peak, Mount Iron, Mount Grand and the Pisa Range, all of which provide views of the surrounding area.

That Wanaka Tree – a willow growing just inside the lake – is a tourist attraction in its own right, featuring on many tourists' Instagram feeds. The tree had its lower branches cut by vandals in 2020.

Festivals

The biennial Warbirds over Wanaka airshow is a major attraction for national and international guests.
Wanakafest
NZ Freeski Open
The biennial New Zealand music Rippon Festival
Challenge Wanaka Triathlon Festival
The Festival of Colour is a biennial multi disciplinary arts festival featuring theatre, music, dance and visual arts. Held every second April, it alternates with the ideas festival Aspiring Conversations; both are organised by the Southern Lakes Arts Festival Trust.  
 Rhythm and Alps
The Wānaka agricultural and pastural show has been held since 1934 at the showgrounds in Wānaka. Thirty to forty thousand people were expected at the 85th edition in March 2022. 
The Wanaka Rodeo is normally held each summer but was forced to cancel the 2022 edition due to "uncertainty around Covid-19 and new regulations".

Film locations
Films made in the Wānaka region include The Lord of the Rings, The Hobbit, the Legend of S, and A Wrinkle in Time.

Summer

Wānaka is host to outdoor recreation and tourism activities with hiking, mountain biking, mountaineering, rock climbing, fishing, paragliding, kayaking, rafting, jetboating, and environmental activities. Wānaka has a sunny climate and serves as an access point to the highest New Zealand mountain outside of the Aoraki/Mount Cook region: Mount Aspiring/Tititea.

Mount Aspiring National Park is popular for mountaineering and hiking. Tourists enjoy day trips into the park and many tourists go hiking in the park for up to a week at a time. Parts of the Matukituki Valley on the road to the park are popular for rock climbing, and for day walks.

Lake Wānaka itself is popular for waterskiing, wakeboarding and sailing. This along with the local rivers provide many opportunities for fishing. There is a dedicated mountain biking area made by volunteers in a local pine forest. Adjacent to the bike park is an 18-hole disc golf course. All the local ski resorts are open for mountain biking and hiking in the summer.

Winter
Wānaka has the broadest range of snow activity choices of any town in New Zealand. These include Treble Cone, Cardrona Alpine Resort and Snow Farm, some of New Zealand's premier commercial ski fields. Wānaka is the main accommodation provider for these resorts and so is very busy in high season (July–September).

Winter in Wānaka is also the home to a variety of winter sporting events including everything from the annual free Winter Games to The Merino Muster.

Treble Cone has good lift-accessed terrain and for this reason has become popular amongst visitors, 'ConeHeads'. It also catches some of the better snow in the area, with its location and orientation getting more snow from NW storms.

Cardrona is more attractive to families and beginners, though an attempt has been made at the park riding population in competition with SnowPark. Snowpark is a dedicated 100% artificial terrain park for advanced riders. Snow Farm is New Zealand's only commercial cross-country ski field.

Cardrona also hosts one of the few Olympic-sized halfpipes in the world and has been used for practice for Olympic competition.

Amenities

Swimming pool 
The Wānaka Recreation Centre has a 25 metre lap pool, a 20 metre learners pool and hot pool for adults. It is located at 41 Sir Tim Wallis Drive. The swimming complex was opened in 2018 and cost $12.8 million.

Wānaka Community Hub 
The Wānaka Community Hub is home to 25 community organisations. The building includes a hall, foyer and offices. The build cost $3.8 million and was opened in October 2021.

Library 
The Wānaka Library is in Dunmore Street. As well as an extensive collection of books and ebooks, audiobooks and newspapers, the library provides Wifi, printing, copying and computer facilities. After issues with freedom campers in 2016, signs in the Wānaka Library ask people not to bathe or wash dishes in the toilets.

Golf course 
The Wānaka golf course, located on Ballantye Road, was established in 1922. A further nine holes were added to the course in 1967 to make it an 18 hole golf course. The Wanaka Golf Club has around 950 members.

Tititea/Mt Aspiring national park visitor centre 
The Tititea/Mt Aspiring national park visitor centre is located on the corner of Ardmore St and Ballentyne Rd. It provides advice about walking and hiking in the national park and information about the huts, campsites, weather and heritage sites. There is also a small museum display of the history, fauna and flora of the national park within the visitor centre.

Pembroke Park 
Pembroke Park covers 10.5 hectares on the foreshore of Lake Wānaka. The majority of the park is grass fields, with a skate park and 136 carparks close to the town centre.

Originally known as "The Commonage", the park was surveyed in 1875 and 1880. A nine-hole golf course was established on the park by 1920, with barbed wire to keep the cows out. From 1940, the New Zealand Electricity Department held the park with the thought that Lake Wanaka might be used for hydro-electricity production. It was designated as a recreational reserve in 1971, managed by Lake County Council, (which later became the Queenstown Lakes District Council).

The establishment of the parking lot in Pembroke Park in 2000 was controversial, as one of its management objectives is "to preserve in perpetuity Pembroke Park as a recreational area for the enjoyment of the people of Wanaka and visitors".

Notable buildings

Saint Columba's Anglican Church 
Saint Columba's was built in 1902 and completed in 1911. It is a category 2 historic place.

Chalmers' cottage 
Chalmers' cottage is a grade 2 listed building. It was built in the 1870s for Archibald Chalmers, who was a butcher based in Wānaka.

Wānaka War Memorial 
The Wānaka War Memorial commemorates the twenty seven soldiers from the area that died in World War I and the nine that died in World War II. It is located on Chalmers Street.

Dinosaur slide 
The dinosaur slide built by the Wānaka Jaycees in 1976 is a well known fixture at the lakefront playground in Wānaka.

Wānaka watersports facility 
Described as having a "richly textured and contoured façade [which] belies the tough functional requirements demanded by a project realised in a sensitive environmental zone", the Wānaka watersports facility was the winner of the 2020 Southern Architecture Awards. It is used by the Wānaka Rowing Club Rowing Club, Wanaka Lake Swimmers and TriWanaka.{ The facility gained resource consent in 2016 despite 744 submitters opposing the build.

Holy Family Catholic Church 
Holy Family Catholic Church was built in 2011 and its organic form was designed to allude to the mountains that surround it. The church replaced the previous church in Brownston Street. It is located next to the Holy Family School.

Education
Wānaka has four schools.

Holy Family School is a state-integrated Catholic full primary (Year 1–8) school, and has  students. The school was established in 2006.
Mount Aspiring College is a state Year 7–13 secondary school, and has  students. The school was established in 1986 following the split of Wanaka Area School.
Wānaka Primary School is a state contributing primary (Year 1–6) school and has  students. The school was established in 1986 following the split of Wanaka Area School and relocated to its current site in October 2010.
Te Kura O Take Kārara is a state contributing primary school, and has  students. The schools was established in 2020, providing capacity for more primary school aged children as Wānaka's population grows.

All these schools are coeducational. Rolls are as of

Infrastructure and services

Transport 

There are daily bus services to Christchurch, Dunedin, Queenstown, Invercargill and Greymouth.

During the early 20th century an unsuccessful proposal was made for the Otago Central Railway, then terminated at Cromwell, to be extended to Wānaka and onward to Lake Hāwea. The main reason for NZR's reluctance was having to cross the Clutha River twice. A more direct route to Hāwea was planned but dropped due to cost.

Utilities 
Aurora Energy operates the electricity distribution network in and around Wānaka. Electricity is fed from Transpower's national grid at Cromwell to Wānaka via twin 66,000-volt lines.

Fresh water for the town is drawn from Lake Wānaka via two inlets and treated by chlorination prior to distribution. Since 2008, the water supply has had issues with Didymo "rock snot" algae entering the system and building up, clogging filters and household plumbing. The Queenstown-Lakes District Council planned to add protozoal treatment to the water supply in 2024.

Commerce
In late 2021, Wānaka became home to the smallest Countdown supermarket in New Zealand. It will provide increased competition in the supermarket trade for Wānaka.

Resource consent was approved for a film studio development in 2021. The film studio is expected to cost $280 million and will include up to 10 sound stages, an 11 hectare lake, an Italian village and replicas of parts of Venice, Paris and New York City.

Notable people
Tim Wallis, pilot
Nico Porteous, New Zealand's youngest Olympic medallist
Zoi Sadowski-Synnott, New Zealand's first winter Olympic gold medallist

References

External links

Wānaka promotions site
Warbirds over Wanaka website

 
Queenstown-Lakes District
Populated places in Otago
Climbing areas of New Zealand
Populated lakeshore places in New Zealand